Titletown,  Titletown USA, and variants may refer to:

Towns given the nickname for success in sports

 Valdosta, Georgia
 Boston, Massachusetts
 Maryville, Missouri

Other
 Titletown District, shopping and entertainment district next to Lambeau Field in Green Bay, Wisconsin
 Titletown High, a Netflix reality show about the Valdosta High School football team's 2020 season in Valdosta, Georgia
 "TitleTown USA", a 2008 SportsCenter segment on the ESPN cable television network

See also
City of Champions (disambiguation)